Pierre Jouel (born 1904, date of death unknown) was a French racing cyclist. He rode in the 1930 Tour de France.

References

1904 births
Year of death missing
French male cyclists
Place of birth missing